The 1974 Haringey Council election took place on 2 May 1974 to elect members of Haringey London Borough Council in London, England. The whole council was up for election and the Labour party stayed in overall control of the council.

Background

Election result

Ward results

Alexandra-Bowes

D. F. W. Billingsley was a sitting councillor for Noel Park ward.
R. A. Penton was a sitting councillor for Noel Park ward.

Bruce Grove

Central Hornsey

Coleraine

Mrs D. Cunningham was a sitting councillor for Seven Sisters ward.

Crouch End

U. M. Thompson was a sitting councillor for South Hornsey ward.

Fortis Green

Green Lanes

High Cross

Highgate

Muswell Hill

Miss C. D. Jackson was a sitting councillor for Stroud Green ward.

Noel Park

A. G. Krokou was a sitting councillor for West Green ward.

Park

D. Page was a sitting councillor for Coleraine ward.

Seven Sisters

South Hornsey

South Tottenham

Stroud Green

Mrs E. M. Murphy was a sitting councillor for Town Hall ward.

Tottenham Central

Town Hall

Mrs L. H. Lipson was a sitting councillor for South Hornsey ward.
Mrs S. A. Berkery Smith was a sitting councillor for South Tottenham ward.

Turnpike

West Green

D. Clark was a sitting councillor for Tottenham Central ward.

References

1974
1974 London Borough council elections